Zinovy Alekseyevich Peshkov (or Pechkov, 16 October 1884 – 27 November 1966) was a Russian-born French general and diplomat.

Early life
Born as Zalman or as Yeshua Zalman Sverdlov (in Russian: Zinovy Mikhailovich Sverdlov), the future Zinovy Peshkov was the second child and eldest son in a Jewish family in Nizhny Novgorod. His father, Mikail Izraylevich (1846?-1921), was a relatively prosperous itinerant coppersmith and copper engraver from the region of Bialystok in the Kingdom of Poland, in an area of Belarusian and Lithuanian influence. His mother, Elizaveta Solomonovna Averbach (1864-1900), was related to merchant families of a city which, since the beginning of the 19th century, had experienced vigorous economic development.

Zinovy's generation was emblematic of the fate of Jewish families who were in contact with the principal powers at the turn of the 19th and 20th centuries. In fact, out of the eight known children of Mikhail and Elisabeth, some settled in Soviet Russia – sometimes by adopting the new regime – while others, having chosen emigration, after crossing Western Europe, settled in the United States. Thus Sarah, the oldest daughter, born in Polotsk, near Vitebsk (in present-day Belarus) in 1876, emigrated to New York around 1913. She died there in 1947. Zinovy, the oldest of the sons, born in 1884, was followed by Yakov (1885-1919), the future political colleague of Lenin. Following these two brothers, who had singular and opposite destinies, several sons and daughters arrived who in their turn, were separated by politics and emigration.

The protege of Gorky
Reluctant to pursue his studies and prepared from adolescence for any adventure, the young Zinovy trolled the streets of Nizhny Novgorod on the fringes of legality, spending his time with the many thugs on the banks of the Volga. In 1896, salvation came upon his meeting a character who undoubtedly had ties to the Sverdlov family, although we have no knowledge of the exact relations between them. Originally from the region where he was placed under house arrest (Nizhny Novgorod, his home town, is 100 km north of Arzamas, where he was exiled), Maxim Gorky – who was then 28 years old – took under his protection the young Zinovy, who he undoubtedly saw as a kind of double as well as a quirky reflection of his own journey.

Gorky organized meetings, promoting his ideas throughout Russia with an uncommon energy. Acting as a kind of secretary and “jack of all trades”, Zinovy brought him a support that was as fervent as it was efficient. He shared his arrests and imprisonments ordered by a hostile regime, at a moment when Gorky was at the threshold of huge success both in and out of Russia, a success which relied on a radical criticism of the aristocracy. Under the guidance of his mentor, the young man, perhaps at the advice of Stanislavski, tried himself in the theater in Moscow as well as in writing. He also collected romantic conquests and opened himself to the world.

1902 was a milestone for Gorky and Sverdlov. The presentation on the stage of the Moscow Art Theatre of “The Lower Depths” marked the first triumph of the writer. At the same moment, his election to the Academy of Literature – which had been annulled by Nicholas II – a major public event, joined another more private one, the adoption at Arzamas, under Russian Orthodox rites, of the young Zinovy. In order to bypass the law limiting movement and settlement of Jews in the empire, but also to mark his link with the writer, Zinovy was baptized on September 30, 1902, in the city church. He officially changed his name, adopting the real last name of Gorky, Peshkov, since the latter was his official godfather.

Wishing to avoid induction into the armies of the Tsar during the Russo-Japanese war of 1904, Zinovy Peshkov went abroad. After Finland, England and Sweden, he ended up settling in Canada, where he worked in a number of trades. Few details are known about this wandering life, except those which his letters to Gorky reveal to us. The 1905 revolution and its upheavals drove the writer into exile.

In April 1906, Zinovy joined his friend on a dock in New York, the first step in a tour in which mobs crowded in to hear his speeches. The New York Times interviewed Peshkov, giving information about Gorky's forthcoming visit, and noting that their source "Nikolay Zavolzsky Pieshkoff (sic), Gorky's adopted son", had fled Russia and for  more than a year: "has been living quietly on the east side and earning his living in the mailing room of Wilshire's Magazine." Four days later the New York Times covered an event where Gorky spoke at length, and was supported by Mark Twain. In this report Peshkov is described as: "Kikolay Zavolsky Pieshkoff, the adopted son of Gorky".  Unfortunately American opinion, at first charmed by the oratorical capacities of Gorky, to which Peshkov’s intermediation provided picturesque relief, changed quickly when it learned that the writer was travelling not with his wife, but with his mistress, Maria Andreieva. Persona non grata, Gorky was forced after being expelled from his hotel to find an improvised pied-a-terre in New York. In October, he left the United States bound for Italy, leaving Zinovy behind.

After a year of wandering across the Pacific Ocean from San Francisco to New Zealand, Peshkov rejoined his adopted father in Italy in May 1907. This was the period of the “School of Capri”, which was an especially formative time for him since many intellectuals and artists (Chaliapine, for example), gathered there; in addition, there were Bolshevik revolutionaries in exile – Lenin, Bogdanov, Lunacharsky, Bazarov, etc. – generously hosted by the writer who assumed all the costs of these visits, in which political theory and action were in daily contact, threatening the Tsarist empire with the greatest danger.

Zinovy, once again acting as Gorky’s secretary, organized this collective life, supervised the details, profiting as well from these unusual encounters to which he was a witness. He rubbed shoulders with Lenin, whom he bore little respect, whose relations with Gorky he later indicated were complicated by often divergent opinions. It was during October 1910, while staying at La Spezia with Alexander Amfiteatrov, that he married the daughter of a Cossack colonel five days after meeting her. He emigrated with her to the United States, where he struggled to find a situation. Shortly afterward, they were separated. From this short liaison, Peshkov had a daughter, Elizabeth. This wife, Lydia Bourago (1889-1966) was perhaps related to Colonel Alexander Bourago, hero of the 1878 war against Turkey, who died in 1883. She is sometimes referred to under the name of Vicomtesse de Combette. Her daughter, Elisabeth Peshkov, was married to Ivan Markov, Soviet ambassador to Rome, who was liquidated in 1937 by order of Stalin.

In 1913 he returned to Capri, where he once again took up his activities with Gorky, who, shortly afterward, profiting from an amnesty offered by the Romanovs to writers guilty of criminal opinions, returned to Russia. The First World War surprised Zinovy in Italy in August 1914. As in 1905, he had no desire to serve the Tsar. Without our being able to know the deeper reasons – he had no particular ties to France during his exile from the empire, having resided mainly across the Atlantic or in Italy – he went to the French consulate in Genoa to enlist in the Foreign Legion.

The hero of the Foreign Legion

Guided to the recruitment post in Nice, he enlisted on August 31, 1914 as EVDG (an acronym for “voluntary enlisted for the duration of the war”) in the marching battalion of the 1st Foreign Regiment. Two months were sufficient to equip and train the volunteers at the beginning of the conflict. Peshkov, who was special – in addition to Russian, he knew French, English, Italian and German, which was useful in a unit containing men from all over the world – was given the rank of 1st class on October 21, 1914. Named corporal on April 1, 1915, he was put in command of a squad. Several days later, in May 1915, during combat with his division before Arras, he was seriously wounded. During the capture of Carency, a bullet shattered his arm while he was leading his soldiers.

Peshkov’s regiment, like its twin, the 2nd marching regiment of the Foreign Legion, absorbed many Russian Jews assembled in these two units, who distinguished themselves in the battle of the Somme and that of Artois. The attack at Carency in May 1915 was a bloody one for these volunteers, as their losses were very great.

Treated near the front, he had to find the strength to make it to the rear. After succeeding in borrowing a train, he found himself in the American hospital at Neuilly, where only amputation saved him from death. Decorated, Corporal Peshkov underwent rehabilitation and then was pensioned. He then returned to Italy. Introduced into high society, where he was a sensation, he gave lectures on the horrors of war, probably inspired by the meetings organized with Gorky several years earlier, which had a great public success. He then found himself again in Paris. On June 22, 1916, Peshkov again enlisted “for the duration of the war” with the grade of 2nd class. He was attached to the 20th section of the military staff. In Paris, he met Philippe Berthelot, Secretary General of the Ministry of Foreign Affairs, who realized what this young mutilated soldier, bedecked with decorations, could bring in terms of propaganda aimed at neutral countries, first of all the United States, a place with which Peshkov was well acquainted.

Convinced of the value of this strategy, the Minister of Foreign Affairs, Briand sent Zinovy to the French Ambassador, Jusserand, with the grade of temporary 3rd class interpreter (lieutenant), for the duration of his mission. At the end of nine months, Peshkov returned to Paris, having accomplished his mission. In fact, in April 1917, President Wilson had the Senate vote on a declaration of war. The United States joined the allies in the conflict.

At that time, diplomatic attention was focused on the European continent. Promoted to the rank of 2nd class interpreter officer (captain) on May 13, 1917, Peshkov was present at the events which plunged Russia into the revolution. In May, the French government sent a mission to the provisional government. He was then asked to participate, the objective being for France to convince the new Russian power to continue the war against the German Empire. This return to his roots was, for Zinovy, an occasion to renew ties to his native land and his family. By way of his brother Yakov, he had contacts with the Bolsheviks, but in no way shared their point of view. He probably saw his brother Veniamin as well as his sisters who had remained in Russia, all supporters of the revolution. The contacts with Gorky were cold, but this climate did not harm the solid friendship which tied the two men.

Lenin’s seizure of power in October was rapidly followed in December by the Brest-Litovsk armistice, which put an end to the Russo-German war, which was a setback for the French diplomatic mission. Zinovy returned to Paris, but the French government, aware of the diplomatic capabilities of Captain Peshkov, soon sent him to advise the White Armies on all the fronts of the civil war which was then bloodying Russia. He was promoted temporary head of a battalion for the duration of his mission from December 9, 1918. He also met the ataman of the Cossacks, Semenov, in Vladivostok, then Admiral Kolchak in the Urals to help him in reorganizing his army. The defeat of the latter sent him in February 1920 to the Caucasus, where he attempted in vain to play a role with General Wrangel. The definitive victory of the Red Army over the Whites in November obligated Peshkov to return to Paris.

At that time, Peshkov was still a man of fashion, who had been “launched” according to the expression popular during that period. He was received in the greatest homes in the company of Princess Salomea Andronikova, who he had met in the Caucasus, brought to Europe and with whom he was sharing his life. He was made permanent Captain by a decree of January 14, 1920. He was attached to the 1st Foreign Regiment. He was later attached to the Ministry of Foreign Affairs to be sent to the United States on January 21, 1921. Returning in May, he remained as secretary of the French delegation of the International Commission for Russia. Still tied to Russia, Zinovy, secretary general of an organization “against famine”, relayed the desperate appeal of Gorky to the international press to gain popular opinion for food aid for his country. This campaign – and the time the writer spent in Germany where he was undergoing treatment – brought the adoptive father and son closer together.

In May 1922, he was put at the disposal of Marshall Lyautey, commander of the troops in Morocco, to be attached to the staff of Meknes. Then he was allocated to the 4th Foreign Infantry Regiment on February 17, 1923, where he commanded the 12th company. Once again, everything about this appointment was astonishing. Peshkov, who received French nationality only the following year, was again in the Foreign Legion with the rank of chief of battalion, although he had no training in command and no experience in the position. Nevertheless, he met the challenge. “The Magnificent One-Armed Man”, as he was nicknamed by his soldiers, led his troops into combat with courage. In June 1925, his left leg was injured during an attack at Bab Taza, “for the sake of symmetry” he quipped, showing the right sleeve of his uniform, useless for the past ten years.

Zinovy, who continued to maintain his ties to foreign affairs, alternated periods of command with diplomatic missions. His stay at the French embassy in the United States from 1926 to 1929 did not prevent him from paying a visit to Gorky at Sorrento during vacations, prior to the writer’s permanent departure for the USSR. During this time Peshkov had a relationship with Irving Thalberg. He met him in Paris in March 1928, with a possible project of adapting his work on the Foreign Legion (published in English as The Bugle Sounds: Life in the Foreign Legion). During his many stays cut short by his command in Morocco, he played an important role in the Levant, particularly intervening with Shi’ite groups in Gabal Amil (now southern Lebanon). During this epoch, he met his second wife, Jacqueline Delaunay-Belleville, the widow of a diplomat, but this marriage, like the earlier one, was quickly dissolved. On the eve of global conflict, chief of battalion Peshkov commanded a unit in Morocco with panache and vigor; his celebrity brought him into close and regular contact with many personalities, members of high society and journalists. It was in this position in North Africa, commander of the 3rd Battalion of the 2nd Foreign Regiment, that he learned of the collapse of the French troops facing the Wehrmacht in May 1940.

The Gaullist diplomat
After having heard the appeal of 18 June of General de Gaulle, then in refuge in London, he decided to join him. His project succeeded, but his first contacts with the head of Free France were difficult. Nevertheless, at the end of 1941, de Gaulle promoted him to the rank of colonel (he remained almost 20 years the head of battalion) and sent him on a mission to South Africa, where he organized the transport of arms for the Allied troops, while keeping an eye on Madagascar, which was relatively near. As was often the case, Peshkov succeeded in establishing confidential relations with the head of the armies in the region, General Smuts. The British occupation of the Big Island precipitated events. Uninterested in a critical and controversial involvement with the English, whom he liked, Zinovy then arranged to be sent to French West Africa, where he brilliantly organized the rallying of the colonies.

Appointed Brigadier General in April 1944, Peshkov was soon sent as a delegate of the French Committee of National Liberation to the Republic of China to meet with Chiang Kai-shek, who had just broken with Vichy. Upon arrival at Chung King, the new capital of the country due to the Japanese occupation, Zinovy had to deal with the presence of another French mission sent by General Giraud, a competitor which he knew how to marginalize with subtlety. Made ambassador in November 1944, his presence once again gave him an occasion to demonstrate his capacity to make himself appreciated by leaders of all backgrounds which were so numerous in a China in full revolution.

After this Chinese period, Peshkov was named French ambassador to Japan in 1946 (or more precisely, head of the French liaison mission with the superior allied commander in the Far East). He was close to General MacArthur, whom he admired, since upon the return of the hero of the Philippines, he was not able to hide the interest he showed toward this officer, who impressed him with his uniqueness.   On December 14, 1946 he invested MacArthur with the Grand Cross of the Legion of Honor.

Concerned with looking after the defeated, the diplomat devoted himself to creating ties of confidence with the Japanese government, which he succeeded gradually in achieving during his mandate. In 1950, General Peshkov was retired and replaced by Maurice Dejean. He left Japan for a final return to Paris. Two years later, the government granted him the honor of the Grand Cross of the Legion of Honor, which profoundly touched the young roughneck of Nizhny Novgorod.

The return to action of General de Gaulle in 1958 pleased General Peshkov, who had always respected the chief of Free France. Upon his return, the head of state did not forget his loyal ally of the hard times. He charged him with a number of diplomatic missions before sending him in 1964 to Chiang Kai-shek. Since France had decided to support the People's Republic of China – i.e. to recognize it diplomatically – the announcement of this turnaround had to be done with the greatest respect for the aged marshal in refuge in Taiwan. The choice of Zinovy was a great homage given to these two soldiers of exceptional destiny.

Zinovy Peshkov died in Paris in November 1966. His ashes are in the Sainte-Geneviève-des-Bois Russian Cemetery. At his request, his tombstone bears only the following inscription: 
 
ZINOVI PECHKOFF
LEGIONNAIRE
16 X 1884  27 XI 1966

Published work
The Foreign Legion in Morocco, 1927. With a preface by André Maurois. The author wrote this book in 1925 while in the military hospital of Rabat, being treated for the wound in his left leg received in combating the Rifians.

Bibliography
Mikhaïl Parkhomovski, Fils de Russie, général de France, Moscou, 1989.
Francis Huré, Portraits de Pechkoff, De Fallois, Paris, 2006

Sources
Képi blanc et Division histoire et patrimoine de la Légion étrangère.
ESS établi lors de sa libération par limite d'âge le 20 août 1940.
Revue historique de l'armée, Légionnaire et diplomate, le capitaine Zinovi Pechkoff par J. Delmas, no 2, 1968.
Who's who in France, 4e édition, notice "Zinovi Pechkoff", 1959-1960.

References

1884 births
1966 deaths
People from Nizhny Novgorod
People from Nizhegorodsky Uyezd
Jews from the Russian Empire
French people of Russian-Jewish descent
French generals
Officers of the French Foreign Legion
French memoirists
French Resistance members
French military personnel of World War I
French military personnel of World War II
Grand Croix of the Légion d'honneur
Emigrants from the Russian Empire to Canada
Eastern Orthodox Christians from France
Converts to Eastern Orthodoxy from Judaism
French amputees
Ambassadors of France to South Africa
Ambassadors of France to China
Ambassadors of France to Japan
Burials at Sainte-Geneviève-des-Bois Russian Cemetery
French male non-fiction writers
Emigrants from the Russian Empire to Italy
20th-century memoirists
20th-century French male writers